Kimmey is a surname of Scottish origin. Notable people with the surname include:

Andrea Kimmey-Baca, American singer
Danielle Kimmey (born 1982), American singer
John D. Kimmey (1828–?), American politician
Lisa Kimmey, American singer

See also 
Kimmey Raschke, Puerto Rican politician

References

Surnames of Scottish origin